Bard is an unincorporated community in Quay County, New Mexico, United States.

Description
From October 8, 1909, to April 23, 1913, the community was officially known as Bard City. Bard had a post office from January 30, 1908, to November 26, 1991; it still has its own ZIP code, 88411. The town also had a gas station and repair garage. In 1946, Bard had a population of 26.

See also

References

External links

Unincorporated communities in Quay County, New Mexico
Unincorporated communities in New Mexico
Ghost towns in New Mexico